San Bruno Herald began as an independent weekly newspaper in San Bruno, California in 1914 and continued publishing through the 1990s.  The Herald was originally located in a small building at 624 San Mateo Avenue (next to the San Bruno Volunteer Fire Department), then it moved to a larger facility on the corner of Angus and Mastick avenues, and finally to a shared facility on San Mateo Avenue in South San Francisco.

History
The first editorial campaign of the Herald was to promote the incorporation of San Bruno, which was successful.  The newspaper operated as a daily newspaper for several years before resuming weekly publication.  It was published every Thursday morning, then distributed to homes and newsstands.  For many years its publisher was A.I. Cloud (1904-1993), who also published two other weekly newspapers, the Recorder Progress, published every Wednesday morning, and the Coastside Chroncicle, published every Saturday morning.

In 1968, the combined circulation of the three newspapers was 50,000.  The Herald eventually added a small Saturday edition.  The longtime news editor was Jack Bik (1922-1984), who wrote most of the editorials and numerous feature stories.   Its sports editor and principal photographer was Warren Wynkoop (1930-1976), who also hosted a program on KCSM (FM) in San Mateo.  Wynkoop regularly covered the career of MLB pitcher Wally Bunker, who graduated from San Bruno's Capuchino High School in June 1963.  The women's editor was Jane Dryden.

The paper relied heavily on part-time columnists, contributors, and sports reporters.  High school journalism students regularly covered meetings of the San Bruno City Council, the San Bruno Planning Commission, and the San Bruno Park School District board meetings.   There were columns devoted to various districts in San Bruno.  A longtime contributor to the paper was Bessie Baughn (1917-1999), sometimes called "Aunt Bessie," who wrote a column, originally called "Cruising Through Crestmoor," and regularly interviewed visiting celebrities such as Jerry Lewis, Danny Thomas, and James Stewart.  There was extensive coverage of local high school and college sports, which won the paper numerous state journalism awards.  The paper publicized and reviewed productions and concerts at Capuchino High School and Crestmoor High School.

In the mid 1960s publisher Cloud bought a new photo offset printing press, which was installed at the Heralds offices on the corner of Angus and Mastick avenues, one block east of San Mateo Avenue.  However, the paper faced increasing deficits and Cloud eventually sold it to Amphlett Printing Company, the owners of The San Mateo Times, in 1968.  To cut costs, Amphlett cut staff and eventually moved the offices and publishing facilities from Angus Avenue to a central facility on San Mateo Avenue in South San Francisco, where the Herald shared offices with weekly newspapers serving Daly City and South San Francisco.

In 1998, Amphlett's newspapers were sold to ANG Newspapers (Alameda Newspaper Group), an Oakland-based subsidiary of MediaNews Group of Denver, Colorado.  The weekly newspapers shared editorial staff, often publishing the same stories in each paper, except for the front page.  There was less coverage of San Bruno news in the Herald, even before the sale, resulting in independent papers such as The San Bruno Beacon, whose editor and publisher is former San Bruno Vice Mayor and City Councilman Bill Baker, and the Millbrae Sun.   Within a few years, the Herald ceased publication.  The San Mateo Times was renamed San Mateo County Times and became the main newspaper for the county.  The only county weekly to survive under ANG's ownership was the Pacifica Tribune.

References 

Weekly newspapers published in California
Defunct newspapers published in California
San Bruno, California